Hirer Angti is a 1992 Bengali film by Rituporno Ghosh based on a story of the same name by Shirshendu Mukhopadhyay.

Plot
Gandharva Kumar's arrival disrupts the festive mood of Durga Puja at Ratanlal Babu's house. Gandharva captivates Ratanlal's grandchildren, Habul and Tinni, with his magical tricks. He then reveals a long-forgotten secret wherein he claims to be heir to Ratanlal's ancestral property. This shocks the entire family and casts a gloom, following dramatic incidents. It is revealed that Gandharva is fake. Whether the magic trick works or not for Gandharva Kumar forms the climax.

Cast

Basanta Choudhury as Ratanlal Bannerjee
Gyanesh Mukherjee as Panchu
Pradip Mukherjee as Bishweshwar
Shakuntala Barua as Pratima
Barun Chanda as Someshwar
Moon Moon Sen as Someshwar's wife
Sumanta Mukherjee as Bireshwar
Dulal Lahiri as Shwet
Ayan Banerjee as Gandharba Kumar / Dilip Kumar
Sunil Mukherjee as Shashthicharan
Bankim Ghosh as Gupi Syankra
Sandipan Mukherjee as Habul
Anchita Dutta as Tinni
Deepankar De as voice of Gandharba Kumar

References

External links

1992 films
1992 drama films
Bengali-language Indian films
Indian children's films
Films directed by Rituparno Ghosh
Films based on works by Shirshendu Mukhopadhyay
1990s Bengali-language films